18S may refer to:

18S ribosomal RNA
18S rRNA (adenine1779-N6/adenine1780-N6)-dimethyltransferase
18SEH

See also
S18 (disambiguation)